Jamie Zorbo (born February 20, 1978) is an American football coach and former player. He is the head football coach at Kalamazoo College, a position he has held since the 2008 season.

Playing career
Zorbo played defensive end for the Kalamazoo College Hornets located in Kalamazoo, Michigan.

Head coaching record

References

External links
 Kalamazoo profile

1978 births
Living people
American football defensive ends
DePauw Tigers football coaches
Kalamazoo Hornets football coaches
Kalamazoo Hornets football players
Western Michigan University alumni
Sportspeople from Battle Creek, Michigan
Players of American football from Michigan